Note also known as NOTA is a 2015 Malaysian crime drama mystery psycho thriller film written and directed by Japanese origin Yasu Tanaka. This was also his debut Malay language directorial venture and was produced by his wife Bea Tanaka under the production company 42nd Pictures. The film stars Hans Isaac in the male lead role, Maya Karin in the female lead role while late actor Ramli Hassan and Rin Izumi play supportive roles. The music for the film is scored by Christopher Higgs and editing is handled by Yashiko Tanaka.

The film was released on 13 August 2013 and received mixed reviews from the audience but was declared as a failure in the box office. Despite the box office failure, the film is still rated as one of the greatest films to have made in Malaysian cinema and was also nominated as one of the best films at the 28th Malaysian Film Festival and eventually won the Best Screenplay Award during the film festival.

Plot  
The film depicts the story of a couple who lived in Kuala Lumpur; Erin (Maya Karin) and Kamal (Hans Isaac) but had problems and arguments very often within themselves. Once they went to Bako National Park to resolve their relationship but met few unexpected consequences which aggravated the situation between the couple.

Cast 

 Hans Isaac as Kamal
 Maya Karin as Erin
 Ramli Hassan as Jemat (boatman)
 Rin Izumi as Mayumi

Production 
The Japanese origin film director made his Malay film debut through this venture and incurred about 1.8 million Malaysian Ringgit as the cost of production. The making of the film was filmed and shot in Sarawak in April 2013 and in Kuala Lumpur in May 2013. The production of the film ended up within 26 days but underwent delays due to other unknown reasons before its original release on 13 August 2015.

Release 
The film had its theatrical release in Malaysia and in United States on 13 August 2015. The film didn't do well at the box office as expected due to its high initial cost and managed to collect only RM 80,000. The film was also released nearly 3 months after the untimely death of actor Ramli Hassan on 7 May 2015 who was part of the cast.

References

External links 

 

Malaysian crime drama films
Malaysian thriller films
Films shot in Kuala Lumpur
Malay-language films